The term boiler may refer to an appliance for heating water. Applications include water heating and central heating.

Operation
The boiler heats water to a temperature controlled by a thermostat. The water then flows (either by natural circulation or by a pump) to radiators in the rooms which are to be heated. Water also flows through a coil in the hot water tank to heat a separate mass of water for bathing, etc.

Condensing boiler

Back boiler

A back boiler is a device which is fitted to a residential heating stove or open fireplace to enable it to provide both room heat and domestic hot water or central heating.

See also
 Electric water boiler
 Heat-only boiler station
 Multi-fuel stove

References

Heating, ventilation, and air conditioning
Residential heating appliances
Boilers